Rahu Abad  is a small town in Umerkot District of the Sindh Province in Pakistan. It is located about 7.5 kilometers away from Samaro, and its main industry is agriculture.

History 
This town was founded by Haji Ali Muhammad Rahu in 1976 . In 1979, Haji Ali Muhammad Rahu allotted his private land to the poor for their settlement. Over time, the population of Rahu Abad increased, and several shops and cabins were built in 1982. It is a center for agricultural trade.

References

 Populated places in Umerkot District